Una pequeña parte del mundo is the second studio album by the Spanish folk rock group Amaral, released in 2000 in Spain.

Track listing 
All tracks composed by Amaral, except Nada de nada, composed by Evangelina Sobredo.
 "Subamos al cielo" (Let's climb up to the sky) – 3:18
 "Cabecita loca" (Crazy little head) – 4:47
 "Como hablar" (How to talk) – 4:01
 "Los aviones no pueden volar" (The airplanes can't fly) – 4:13
 "Queda el silencio" (Silence is left) – 4:00
 "Una pequeña parte del mundo" (A small part of the world) – 3:27
 "Botas de terciopelo" (Velvet boots) – 4:05
 "Volverá la suerte" (Luck will come back) – 4:25
 "El día de año nuevo" (The day of New Year) – 3:58
 "El mundo al revés" (The world upside down) – 4:39
 "Siento que te extraño" (I feel that I miss you) – 3:36
 "Nada de nada" (Nothing at all) – 3:41
 "El final" (The end) – 1:50

Chart performance
In 2005, Una pequeña parte del mundo peaked at #43 in Spain.

Certifications

References

2000 albums
Amaral (band) albums